Gus Wingfield (born September 17, 1926)  is a former one-term Arkansas State Treasurer, and two-term Arkansas State Auditor, 1994–2003. He served as treasurer from 2003 to 2007.

Early life 
Wingfield was born in Antoine, Arkansas and went to a public school in the nearby town of Delight, Arkansas. He served in the Air Force, and is a veteran of both World War II and the Korean War. After the Korean War he attended college at the Southern Technical Institute in Dallas, Texas, and later went to the University of Arkansas.

Business career 
Wingfield became a respected employee at the Bank of Delight, where his savviness and intelligence, as well as his well connected family, helped him quickly rise the ranks. In 1968, he was hired as Executive Vice President and a member of the Board of Directors. He went on to hold that position for over 22 years, until he retired to serve as State Auditor.

Early political career 
He was elected in the mid-1970s to the Delight School Board.  In 1978 he lost his first race for the Arkansas General Assembly by just over 300 votes.  In 1980 he ran again and won the District 18 seat. He served a total of 14 years a State Representative, during which he became highly respected, and well known within Democratic circles, which helped him in the 1994 primary for State Auditor.

1994 election as State Auditor 
He left the State House of Representatives to run for State Auditor in the Republican year of 1994, however, their gains in Arkansas were minimal. The most competitive part of the race was the primary, which he narrowly won, defeating fellow State Representative Bobby Tullis by just over 3 percentage points. He went on to easily win the General Election, defeating the Republican candidate 63-37. He went on to serve two terms as State Auditor.

In 2002, When Democrat Jimmie Lou Fisher, the long time State Treasurer of Arkansas, having served the maximum number of terms under the 1994 terms limits approved by Arkansas voters, ran against incumbent Republican Mike Huckabee, Gus Wingfield ran for her open State Treasurer Seat. He won the Democratic primary easily, and ended up winning what was a surprisingly competitive and close statewide race against Randy Bynum. Wingfield took only 57% of the vote in that election, which turned out to be his smallest margin in the three statewide elections he has run, and in his entire political career.

Political views 
Wingfield is considered a part of the conservative wing of the U.S. Democratic Party.

Retirement 
Wingfield has said he has no intentions of running for further public office, and that he would like to enjoy retirement before he dies. He told Arkansas News Bureau, in this article,  ""We're looking at a great trip. We want to catch Amtrak and go up through Canada and all the away across Canada and view the Rockies, do stuff like that."

Election history 

2002 General Election

Unopposed in 1998 reelection.

1994 General Election

1994 Democratic Primary

References 
 http://www.state.ar.us/treasury/bio_page.html Official Bio
 https://web.archive.org/web/20061109204201/http://www.arkansasnews.com/archive/2006/02/10/News/333958.html
 http://uselectionatlas.org/RESULTS/state.php?year=1994&off=11&elect=0&fips=5&f=0

Living people
1926 births
Democratic Party members of the Arkansas House of Representatives
School board members in Arkansas
State Auditors of Arkansas
State treasurers of Arkansas
American military personnel of the Korean War
American military personnel of World War II
Military personnel from Arkansas
People from Pike County, Arkansas